Ardlethan is a small service town  in the Coolamon Shire in New South Wales, Australia. Ardlethan is at the intersection of the Burley Griffin Way and Newell Highway.

Ardlethan lays claim to be the birthplace of the Australian kelpie.

History
Ardlethan was established in the 19th century after gold was discovered but gold mining was short-lived. The railway line opened in 1908. Passenger services ceased in 1983 however the line remains open for goods trains.

Warri Post Office opened on 1 October 1907 and was renamed Ardlethan in 1908.

Tin mining began in 1912, and became an economic backbone of the town.  A major labour strike in the 1930s gained national coverage.  The open cut pit was at one time the largest in the Southern Hemisphere, and is located approximately 5 kilometres North West of the township.  Mining eventually went underground and continued through to the late 1980s.  The tin mine was reopened in late 2001, particularly for alluvial mining, but closed in mid-2004 after Marlborough Resources was placed under voluntary administration due to disappointing results at its new processing plant, poor tin price hedging results, and lower-than-expected tin reserves.  Australian Tin Resources Pty Ltd (ATR) now owns the mine. As at 24 January 2019 ATR had received Development Application consent from Coolamon Shire Council for a Rehabilitation and Tailings Reprocessing Project on the site. They intend to first carry out small scale pilot plant processing operations on site for about 2–3 months to prove up the processing technology, before increasing the scale of the operations.

Sport
The town used to have a rugby league team, which was formed in 1923, but the most popular sport in Ardlethan is Australian rules football, as it lies in the narrow 'canola belt', a geographical triangle stretching from the Grong Grong and Marrar at either end of the Canola Way, to Lake Cargelligo in which Australian football retains a strong following, despite being in the rugby league supporting state of New South Wales. 

In 1930, Ardlethan Rugby Club won the Walton Shield with a win against Rankins Springs.

Ardlethan Football Club
The Ardlethan Football Club was formed in 1912 and initially played in the Barellan & District Football Association.

The Barellan & Ardlethan Football Association was formed in 1914 and played in this competition in 1915, then the club went into recess between 1916 and 1918, due to World War One.

The club was reformed in 1919 and played in the Barellan & Becktom Football Association from 1919 to 1921.

From 1927 to 1928, Ardlethan played in the Ariah Park & District Australian Rules Football Association.

In 1935, the Barellan & Ardlethan Football League was formed.

Ardlethan FC won the 1952 Barellan Football Association premiership, defeating Kamarah at Barellan, wearing a black and white jumper.

The Ardlethan Football Club played in the South West Football League (New South Wales) from 1956 to 1981 and initially wore a jumper featuring three vertical stripes, red, black and gold. 

The club then joined the Riverina Football League in 1982, then joined the Farrer Football League in 1987.

In 2004, Ardlethan and Ariah Park - Mirrool merged to form the Northern Jets Football Club and still competes in the Farrer Football League.

Population
In the 2016 Census, there were 387 people in the Ardlethan urban centre. 77.1% of people were born in Australia and 81.5% of people only spoke English at home.

Climate

References

External links 

Ardlethan Railway Siding

Mining towns in New South Wales
Towns in the Riverina
Newell Highway
Coolamon Shire